The Langeled pipeline (originally known as Britpipe) is an underwater gas pipeline transporting Norwegian natural gas to the United Kingdom. Before the completion of the Nord Stream 1 pipeline, it was the longest subsea pipeline in the world.

History
The project was launched under the original name Britpipe. In October 2003, Royal Dutch Shell, ExxonMobil and Statoil signed agreements to supply natural gas through the Britpipe.  The pipeline's construction began in 2004. The largest part of the pipeline was installed by Acergy Piper, a pipe-laying ship of Acergy.  Other pipe-laying ships, which were used, are Solitaire of Allseas, and Saipem 7000 of Saipem.

The pipeline was opened in two stages. The southern section (Sleipner Riser platform to Easington) began piping gas on 1 October 2006, the northern section (Nyhamna to Sleipner Riser) opened in October 2007. The official opening of the project was held in London on 16 October 2006 by then-Prime Minister Tony Blair and his Norwegian counterpart, Jens Stoltenberg.

Route

The pipeline runs  through the North Sea from the Nyhamna terminal in Norway via the Sleipner Riser platform in the North Sea to Easington Gas Terminal in England.  The pipeline is designated to bring natural gas from the Ormen Lange gas process terminal to the UK, but through the connector at Sleipner Riser it provides also an opportunity to send gas through Gassco's existing network to continental Europe.

Technical description
That equates to some 20% of Britain's peak gas demand. With the energy content of natural gas at 39 MJ (megajoules) per normal cubic meter, the capacity energy flux is 31.5 GW (gigawatts).

The Langeled pipeline supplements the Vesterled system with annual capacity about 12 bcm, which runs from Heimdal Riser platform in the North Sea to St. Fergus in Scotland.

The project cost £1.7 billion.

Nyhamna-Sleipner Riser section

Hub at Sleipner Riser
At Sleipner Riser the Langeled has a connection to the existing Gassled transport system.

Sleipner Riser-Easington section
Its pressure is 155 bar.

Ownership and operation
The owner of the Langeled pipeline is Gassled. The operator for Langeled is Gassco and technical service provider is Equinor. Equinor also runs the gas export project.  The principal funding of the project was provided by the syndicated loan structured by ABN AMRO and mainly subscribed by several banks, among them Barclays Bank, Royal Bank of Scotland, and Defoe Fournier & Cie.

See also

Interconnector
BBL Pipeline
Frigg UK System
Snøhvit

References

External links

Langeled, Statoil website
Langeled, Gassco website

Natural gas pipelines in Norway
Natural gas pipelines in the United Kingdom
North Sea energy
Pipelines under the North Sea
Norway–United Kingdom relations
Equinor
2006 establishments in England
2006 establishments in Norway